Lynn Hallett is a former professional rugby league footballer who played in the 1980s.

International honours
Lynn Hallett won 2 caps for Wales in 1982–1984 while at Cardiff City (Bridgend) Blue Dragons 2-goals 4-points.

Note
Before the start of the 1984/85 season, Cardiff City Blue Dragons relocated from Ninian Park in Cardiff, to Coychurch Road Ground in Bridgend, and were renamed Bridgend Blue Dragons.

References

Living people
Cardiff City Blue Dragons players
Rugby league five-eighths
Rugby league fullbacks
Wales national rugby league team players
Welsh rugby league players
Year of birth missing (living people)